Waitākere is a small, mostly rural settlement to the northwest of Auckland, New Zealand.

History

The settlement is in the traditional rohe of Te Kawerau ā Maki. The many hills of the area were known as Ngā Rau Pou ā Maki, referring to the eponymous ancestor of the tribe.

Waitakere Road had two bridges constructed to bypass the now Township Road making it a dead-end or cul-de-sac.

Demographics

Waitākere had a population of 1,935 at the 2018 New Zealand census, an increase of 123 people (6.8%) since the 2013 census, and an increase of 180 people (10.3%) since the 2006 census. There were 657 households, comprising 975 males and 960 females, giving a sex ratio of 1.02 males per female. The median age was 39.5 years (compared with 37.4 years nationally), with 390 people (20.2%) aged under 15 years, 357 (18.4%) aged 15 to 29, 987 (51.0%) aged 30 to 64, and 201 (10.4%) aged 65 or older.

Ethnicities were 91.5% European/Pākehā, 14.6% Māori, 6.2% Pacific peoples, 4.0% Asian, and 2.2% other ethnicities. People may identify with more than one ethnicity.

The percentage of people born overseas was 18.1, compared with 27.1% nationally.

Although some people chose not to answer the census's question about religious affiliation, 60.2% had no religion, 27.3% were Christian, 0.5% had Māori religious beliefs, 0.9% were Hindu, 0.6% were Muslim, 0.3% were Buddhist and 2.6% had other religions.

Of those at least 15 years old, 321 (20.8%) people had a bachelor's or higher degree, and 228 (14.8%) people had no formal qualifications. The median income was $41,800, compared with $31,800 nationally. 381 people (24.7%) earned over $70,000 compared to 17.2% nationally. The employment status of those at least 15 was that 915 (59.2%) people were employed full-time, 258 (16.7%) were part-time, and 48 (3.1%) were unemployed.

Education
It was established in 1921.

List of places within Waitakere township 
 Waitakere RSA 
 Waitakere Dairy & Postshop there was an armed robbery in 2017.
 Waitakere railway station
 Waitakere Township Hall
 Waitakere War Memorial Park 
 Waitakere Fire Station 
 Waitakere Kindergarten

Notable people 
 Arthur "Artie" Campbell Jonkers Artie was a well known figure on the family farm in Waitakere township where he worked tirelessly farming sheep.

See also 
 Waitakere City

References 

Waitākere Ranges Local Board Area
Populated places in the Auckland Region
Waitākere Ranges
West Auckland, New Zealand